Campo may refer to:

Places
Cameroon
 Campo, Cameroon, in the South Province
Equatorial Guinea
 Río Campo, in the Litoral Province
France
 Campo, Corse-du-Sud, a commune on the island of Corsica
Italy
 Campo P.G., a World War II prisoner-of-war camp
 Campo, Cortina d'Ampezzo, a frazione in the province of Belluno, Veneto
 Campo, San Giuliano Terme, a frazione in the province of Pisa, Tuscany
 Campo (Venice), a type of square
Portugal
 Campo (Reguengos de Monsaraz), a parish in the municipality of Reguengos de Monsaraz
 Campo (São Martinho), a former civil parish in the municipality of Santo Tirso
 Campo (Valongo), a parish in the municipality of Valongo
 Campo (Viseu), a parish in the municipality of Viseu
 Campo e Tamel (São Pedro Fins), a civil parish in the municipality of Barcelos
Spain
 Campo, Spain, a municipality in the province of Huesca
Switzerland
 Campo, Vallemaggia, a municipality in the district of Vallemaggia in the canton of Ticino
United States
 Campo, California
 Campo Indian Reservation, in southern California
 Campo, Colorado
 Campo's, a delicatessen in Philadelphia, Pennsylvania

People

 David Campese (born 1962), Australian rugby player, nicknamed 'Campo'
 Bobby Campo (born 1983), American actor
 Dave Campo (born 1947), American coach in American football
 Iván Campo (born 1974), Spanish footballer
 John P. Campo (1938–2005), American racehorse trainer
 Lode Campo (1926–2009), Belgian business executive
 Pancho Campo (born 1961), Spanish event organiser
 Pupi Campo (1920–2011), Cuban musician and dancer
 Rafael Campo (1813–1890), El Salvadorian politician
 Régis Campo (born 1968), French composer
 Roberto Martín del Campo (born 1967), Mexican chess master

Art, entertainment, and media
 Campo (musical project), a musical project by Juan Campodónico and Bajofondo

Education
 Campolindo High School or Campo, a large public high school in Moraga, California

Organizations
 Capital Area Metropolitan Planning Organization (CAMPO) in Texas

Other
Puerta del Campo, a former City Gate in Valladolid, Castile and León, Spain

See also

 Campo Grande (disambiguation)
 Campo Maior (disambiguation)
 Cambo (disambiguation)
 Campos (disambiguation)
 Kambo (disambiguation)
 Kampos (disambiguation)